Events in the year 1123 in Norway.

Incumbents

 Monarchs – Eystein I Magnusson, Sigurd the Crusader (co-rulers)

Events
Kalmare ledung, a Crusade led by King Sigurd to Christianize the Swedish provinces of Småland and Öland.

Arts and literature

Births

Deaths

29 August – Eystein I Magnusson, King of Norway 1102–1123 (born c. 1088).

References

Norway